This is a list of sister cities in the United States states of New England (i.e., Connecticut, Maine, Massachusetts, New Hampshire, Rhode Island, and Vermont). Sister cities, known in Europe as town twins, are cities which partner with each other to promote human contact and cultural links, although this partnering is not limited to cities and often includes counties, regions, states and other sub-national entities.

Many New England jurisdictions work with foreign cities through Sister Cities International, an organization whose goal is to "promote peace through mutual respect, understanding, and cooperation."

Connecticut
Bridgeport
 Qingyuan, China

Coventry
 Coventry, England, United Kingdom

Danbury
 Gouveia, Portugal

Enfield

 Ronneby, Sweden
 Zhongli (Taoyuan), Taiwan

Essex
 Deschapelles (Verrettes), Haiti

Greenwich

 Hangzhou, China
 Kitzbühel, Austria
 Morra De Sanctis, Italy
 Nacka, Sweden
 Rose, Italy
 Vienne, France

Groton
 Kingston, Jamaica

Hartford

 Caguas, Puerto Rico
 Dongguan, China
 Floridia, Italy

 Morant Bay, Jamaica
 New Ross, Ireland
 Ocotal, Nicaragua
 Sogakope, Ghana
 Thessaloniki, Greece

Middletown
 Melilli, Italy

New Britain

 Atsugi, Japan
 Giannitsa, Greece
 Pułtusk, Poland
 Rastatt, Germany
 Solarino, Italy

New Haven

 Afula, Israel
 Amalfi, Italy
 Avignon, France
 Changsha, China
 Freetown, Sierra Leone
 Huế, Vietnam
 León, Nicaragua
 San Francisco Tetlanohcan, Mexico

New London
 Kingston, Jamaica

Norwalk

 Nagarote, Nicaragua
 Riobamba, Ecuador

Seymour
 Nakło nad Notecią, Poland

Stamford

 Afula, Israel
 Jiangdu (Yangzhou), China
 Lima, Peru
 Minturno, Italy
 Rose, Italy
 Settefrati, Italy
 Sparta, Greece

Stratford

 Stratford (Wellington), Australia
 Stratford, Ontario, Canada
 Stratford, Prince Edward Island, Canada
 Stratford, New Zealand
 Stratford-upon-Avon, England, United Kingdom

Torrington
 Changzhou, China

Trumbull
 Xinyi, China

Waterbury

 Pontelandolfo, Italy
 Struga, North Macedonia

West Hartford
 Afula, Israel

Westport

 Marigny-le-Lozon, France
 Saint Petersburg, Russia
 Yangzhou, China

Wethersfield
 Nagayo, Japan

Maine
Bangor

 Carasque (Arcatao), El Salvador
 Saint John, Canada

Bath
 Tsugaru, Japan

Farmington
 Lac-Mégantic, Canada

Old Orchard Beach
 Mimizan, France

Portland

 Arkhangelsk, Russia
 Cap-Haïtien, Haiti
 Mytilene, Greece
 Shinagawa (Tokyo), Japan

Topsfield
 Toppesfield, England, United Kingdom

Waterville
 Kotlas, Russia

Massachusetts
Amesbury
 Esabalu, Kenya

Amherst

 Kanegasaki, Japan
 Nyeri, Kenya
 La Paz Centro, Nicaragua

Andover
 Andover, England, United Kingdom

Arlington

 Nagaokakyō, Japan
 Portarlington, Ireland
 Teosinte (San Francisco Morazán), El Salvador

Barnstable
 Barnstaple, England, United Kingdom

Billerica
 Billericay, England, United Kingdom

Boston

 Barcelona, Spain
 Beira, Mozambique
 Belfast, Northern Ireland, United Kingdom
 Hangzhou, China
 Kyoto, Japan
 Melbourne, Australia
 Padua, Italy
 Praia, Cape Verde
 Sekondi-Takoradi, Ghana
 Strasbourg, France
 Taipei, Taiwan

Brewster
 Budleigh Salterton, England, United Kingdom

Brookline
 Quezalguaque, Nicaragua

Cambridge

 Les Cayes, Haiti
 Coimbra, Portugal
 Gaeta, Italy
 Galway, Ireland
 San José Las Flores, El Salvador
 Tsukuba, Japan
 Yerevan, Armenia

Concord

 Nanae, Japan
 Saint-Mandé, France

Dartmouth

 Dartmouth, England, United Kingdom
 Lagoa, Portugal
 Nordeste, Portugal
 Povoação, Portugal

Fairhaven

 Lagoa, Portugal
 Tosashimizu, Japan

Fall River

 Lagoa, Portugal
 Ponta Delgada, Portugal
 Ribeira Grande, Portugal

Fitchburg

 Kleve, Germany
 Kokkola, Finland

Framingham

 Governador Valadares, Brazil
 Lomonosov, Russia

Gloucester

 Lunenburg, Canada
 Shelburne, Canada
 Tamano, Japan

Great Barrington

 Fada N'gourma, Burkina Faso
 Ingersoll, Canada

Holyoke

 Svaliava, Ukraine
 Tralee, Ireland

Hudson
 Vila do Porto, Portugal

Lanesborough
 Lanesborough–Ballyleague, Ireland

Lexington
 Antony, France

Lowell

 Bamenda, Cameroon
 Barclayville, Liberia
 Berdyansk, Ukraine

 Kalamata, Greece
 Nairobi, Kenya
 Limerick, Ireland
 Lobito, Angola
 Phnom Penh, Cambodia
 Saint-Dié-des-Vosges, France
 Winneba, Ghana

Mansfield
 Mansfield, England, United Kingdom

Marblehead
 Grasse, France

Marlborough
 Akiruno, Japan

Medford
 Nobeoka, Japan

Nantucket
 Beaune, France

New Bedford

 Derry, Northern Ireland, United Kingdom
 Grimsby, England, United Kingdom
 Figueira da Foz, Portugal
 Funchal, Portugal
 Horta, Portugal
 Ílhavo, Portugal
 São Vicente, Cape Verde
 Tosashimizu, Japan
 Utqiagvik, United States
 Youghal, Ireland

Newburyport
 Bura, Kenya

Newton

 San Donato Val di Comino, Italy
 San Juan del Sur, Nicaragua

North Adams
 Tremosine sul Garda, Italy

Pittsfield

 Ballina, Ireland
 Cava de' Tirreni, Italy
 Larreynaga, Nicaragua

Plymouth

 Plymouth, England, United Kingdom
 Shichigahama, Japan

Rehoboth
 Lagoa, Portugal

Revere
 Date, Japan

Salem
 Ōta (Tokyo), Japan

Scituate
 Sucy-en-Brie, France

Somerville

 Gaeta, Italy
 Nordeste, Portugal
 Tiznit, Morocco
 Yucuaiquín, El Salvador

Springfield

 Bracigliano, Italy
 Takikawa, Japan
 Tralee, Ireland

Sturbridge
 Stourbridge, England, United Kingdom

Taunton

 Angra do Heroísmo, Portugal
 Lagoa, Portugal
 Taunton, England, United Kingdom

Watertown
 Nueva Esperanza (Jiquilisco), El Salvador

Winchester
 Saint-Germain-en-Laye, France

Worcester

 Afula, Israel
 Piraeus, Greece
 Pushkin, Russia
 Worcester, England, United Kingdom

New Hampshire
Concord
 Agua Caliente, El Salvador

Hanover

 Joigny, France
 Nihonmatsu, Japan

Keene
 Einbeck, Germany

Manchester

 Neustadt an der Weinstraße, Germany
 Taichung, Taiwan

Nashua
 Mysore, India

Portsmouth

 Agadir, Morocco
 Carrickfergus, Northern Ireland, United Kingdom
 Kitase, Ghana
 Nichinan, Japan
 Pärnu, Estonia
 Severodvinsk, Russia

Rye
 Rye, England, United Kingdom

Rhode Island
Bristol
 Lagoa, Portugal

Coventry

 Coventry, England, United Kingdom
 Selwyn, New Zealand

Cranston
 Itri, Italy

East Providence
 Ribeira Grande, Portugal

Johnston
 Panni, Italy

Newport

 Imperia, Italy
 Kinsale, Ireland
 Ponta Delgada, Portugal
 Saint John, Canada
 Shimoda, Japan
 Skiathos, Greece

Pawtucket
 Belper, England, United Kingdom

Providence

 Guatemala City, Guatemala

 Praia, Cape Verde
 Santo Domingo, Dominican Republic
 Zhuhai, China

West Warwick
 Fornelli, Italy

Vermont
Bennington
 Somotillo, Nicaragua

Burlington

 Arad, Israel
 Bethlehem, Palestine
 Honfleur, France
 Moss Point, United States
 Puerto Cabezas, Nicaragua
 Yaroslavl, Russia

Hartford
 Cenon, France

Rutland
 Hanamaki, Japan

References

New England
Populated places in Connecticut
Populated places in Maine
Populated places in Massachusetts
Populated places in New Hampshire
Populated places in Rhode Island
Populated places in Vermont
Sister cities of New England
Connecticut geography-related lists
Maine geography-related lists
New Hampshire geography-related lists
Rhode Island geography-related lists
Vermont geography-related lists
Cities in Connecticut
Cities in Maine
Cities in Massachusetts
Cities in New Hampshire
Cities in Rhode Island
Cities in Vermont